Lichtenstein is a surname shared by:

Princely house
List of Princes of Liechtenstein
List of Princesses of Liechtenstein

In arts and media
Alfred Lichtenstein (writer), German writer
Bill Lichtenstein, journalist and producer
David Lichine, born David Liechtenstein, Russian-American ballet dancer and choreographer
Harvey Lichtenstein, American arts administrator
Roy Lichtenstein, painter

In religion
Aharon Lichtenstein, Orthodox rabbi
Ignatz Lichtenstein, Hungarian rabbi (also Isaac L.)
Morris Lichtenstein, rabbi, founder of the Jewish Science

In science and mathematics
Anton August Heinrich Lichtenstein (1753–1816), German zoologist
Hinrich Lichtenstein (1780–1857), also known as Martin Lichtenstein, German botanist and zoologist
Leon Lichtenstein, Polish-German mathematician

In other fields
Alfred Lichtenstein (philatelist), American philatelist
David Lichtenstein, American businessperson
Nelson Lichtenstein, labor historian
Warren Lichtenstein, American businessman and philanthropist

See also 
 Lichtenstein (disambiguation)

German-language surnames
Jewish surnames
Surnames of Czech origin